Martín Elías Díaz Acosta (June 18, 1990 – April 14, 2017), better known as Martín Elías, was a Colombian vallenato singer and entrepreneur, son of the singer and composer Diomedes Díaz. He was considered a pioneer of the 'new wave' of vallenato music.

Discography 
 Una nueva historia (2007)
 Marcando la diferencia (2008)
 Cosa de Locos (2009)
 El terremoto musical (2011)
 Homenaje a los más grandes del vallenato (2011)
 El boom del momento (2012)
 La historia continua (2014)
 Imparables (2015)
 Entre Díaz y canciones (2015)
 Homenaje a los grandes Volumen II (2016)

References 

1990 births
2017 deaths
Road incident deaths in Colombia
People from Valledupar
Vallenato musicians
21st-century Colombian male singers